"Hard Tack, Come Again No More" is an American Civil War-era parody of the song "Hard Times, Come Again No More."  First called "Hard Crackers, Come Again No More!", it is a sarcastic complaint about the quality of some of the provisions provided by military contractors, specifically hardtack.  The authors of the many verses of the parody are unknown, although the first version is often attributed to Josiah Fowler of the First Iowa Infantry dating to just after the Battle of Boonville, June 1861.

Lyrics

Having to consume less appetizing food for extended periods led to revisions wishing for the return of hard tack.

References

Bibliography
Billings, John D. Hardtack and Coffee: Or, The Unwritten Story of Army Life. Boston: George M. Smith & Co. (1887).
Ware, E.F. The Lyon Campaign in Missouri: Being a History of the First Iowa Infantry. Topeka, Kansas: Crane & Company (1907).

External links
"Hard Tack, Come No More Again"—Songs of the Union.

Songs of the American Civil War
American folk songs
1861 songs